Rheita can refer to:

 Rheita (crater), the lunar crater 
 Vallis Rheita, the lunar valley 
 Anton Maria Schyrleus of Rheita (1597-1660), the Austrian-Czech astronomer after whom the crater and the valley are named